is a junction passenger railway station located in the city of Takamatsu, Kagawa Prefecture, Japan. It is operated by JR Shikoku and has the station number "Y00" and "T28" .

Lines
The station is terminus of the JR Shikoku Yosan Line and is located 297.6 km from the opposing terminus of the line at Uwajima. It is also the terminus of the JR Shikoku Kōtoku Line and is 74.5 kilometers from the terminus of that line at Tokushima.

Layout
Takamatsu Station is an above-ground station with four bay platforms serving nine tracks. As the platforms all dead head, the station building is located at the end, allowing barrier-free access. The station has a Midori no Madoguchi staffed ticket office.

Ground-level platforms

History
Takamatsu Station opened on 21 February 1897. With the privatization and dissolution of Japan National Railways on 1 April 1987, the station came under the control of the newly created Japan Railways Shikoku (JR Shikoku).

Surrounding area
Takamatsu-Chikkō Station
 National Route 30
Takamatsu Castle

See also
List of railway stations in Japan

References

External links

 Takamatsu Station (JR Shikoku) 

Yosan Line
Railway stations in Takamatsu
Railway stations in Japan opened in 1897